Chavies is a residential hamlet with a U.S. Post Office located in Perry County, Kentucky, United States.

References

Unincorporated communities in Perry County, Kentucky
Unincorporated communities in Kentucky